Auriculigerina is a genus of medium-sized sea snails, marine gastropod mollusks in the family Eulimidae.

Species
There is currently only one known species within this genus: 
 Auriculigerina miranda Dautzenberg, 1925

References

External links
 To World Register of Marine Species

Eulimidae